Our Lady Queen of Peace Catholic Engineering College is a coeducational Roman Catholic secondary school located in Skelmersdale in the English county of Lancashire.

It is a voluntary aided school administered by Lancashire County Council and the Roman Catholic Archdiocese of Liverpool. The school is currently designated as a specialist Engineering College.

Our Lady Queen of Peace Catholic Engineering College offers GCSEs as programmes of study for pupils. The school also offers some vocational courses in conjunction with Myerscough College and West Lancashire College.

References

External links
Our Lady Queen of Peace Catholic Engineering College official website

Secondary schools in Lancashire
Schools in the Borough of West Lancashire
Catholic secondary schools in the Archdiocese of Liverpool
Voluntary aided schools in England
Skelmersdale